George Kambosos Jr (born 14 June 1993) is an Australian professional boxer who held the WBA (Super), IBF, WBO and The Ring lightweight titles from 2021 to June 2022. As of September 2022, he's ranked as the world's number one lightweight by The Ring and TBRB, and the world's number three lightweight by BoxRec.

Early life
Kambosos was born in Sydney to parents of Greek descent. His paternal grandparents moved from Sparta, Laconia, to Australia and Kambosos has the famous Spartan war cry "Never retreat, never surrender" tattooed on his body in homage to his heritage. He began playing junior rugby league for the Gymea Gorillas at a young age, and was often bullied as a child for being overweight, so his father enrolled him in boxing classes at 11 years of age to improve his fitness. Kambosos quickly dropped the excess weight and was placed in the Cronulla Sharks development squad where he was coached by Ricky Stuart but found himself at a crossroad as a teenager when he was forced to choose between boxing and rugby league. He elected to pursue the boxing pathway and began his fighting career by amassing 85 wins in 100 amateur fights before turning professional. Kambosos attended Bexley Public School in the southern suburbs of Sydney throughout his upbringing.

Professional career

Early career 
Kambosos made his professional boxing debut in May 2013, at the age of 19, when he faced Filipino fighter Jayson Mac Gura and was victorious via a second round technical knockout. In December 2016, he captured the WBA Oceania title by beating world number nine Brandon Ogilvie. He then went on to face Qamil Balla in May 2017, whom he defeated by unanimous decision in a ten-round fight. Five months later, he knocked out Krai Setthaphon in the ninth round and won the WBA Oceania and IBF Pan Pacific titles in the lightweight division.

Pacquiao's sparring partner 
In June 2017, Kambosos was tabbed by Manny Pacquiao as his main sparring partner in preparation for the fight with Jeff Horn and has remained Pacquiao's main sparring partner for his fights after Horn as well. In April 2018, Kambosos signed a promotional contract with DiBella Entertainment. 

In May 2018, he made his debut in the US and knocked out Jose Forero in just 1 minute and 48 seconds. On 19 January 2019, Kambosos defeated Rey Perez at The MGM Grand in Las Vegas on the undercard of Manny Pacquiao vs Adrien Broner via unanimous decision in his second fight on US soil. On 7 June in Athens, Kambosos returned to his native land of Greece and knocked out Venezuelan 11–2 (9 KOs) Richard Pena in round six in front of the packed out Galatsi Olympic Hall. He called out former two division world champion José Pedraza after his victory.

Rise up the ranks

Kambosos vs Bey 
On 14 December 2019, Kambosos faced his toughest opponent yet, former IBF lightweight champion Mickey Bey. He won the bout by split decision on the undercard of Terence Crawford vs Egidijus Kavaliauskas. Scorecards read 97–92, 96–93 and 94–95 in favour of Kambosos.

Kambosos vs Selby 
On 31 October 2020, Kambosos defeated former IBF featherweight champion Lee Selby by split decision at The SSE Arena in London. Selby was ranked #1 by the WBO, #4 by the IBF and #12 by the WBC at the time. The win over Selby made Kambosos the mandatory challenger for the IBF lightweight title.

Unified lightweight champion

Kambosos vs López

On 9 January 2021, the IBF ordered undefeated unified lightweight champion Teófimo López to defend his titles against Kambosos, their number one contender and mandatory challenger. The fight was initially set for 5 June 2021 at the LoanDepot Park in Miami, Florida, before being postponed multiple times, due to complications involving López contracting COVID-19, and disputes over the venue of the fight. The fight had gone to purse bids which was won by Triller with a winning bid of over US$6 million. However, on 6 October, it transpired that the IBF had found Triller in default of its contract obligation to stage the fight, and that its rights would be awarded to the second highest bidder, Eddie Hearn's Matchroom, and the fight was shown live exclusively on the streaming service DAZN. Kambosos won the bout via split decision to become the new unified lightweight world champion. One judge had it 114–113 for López, while the other two judges scored the bout 115–112 and 115–111 in favour of Kambosos.

Kambosos vs Haney

On 5 June 2022, Kambosos Jr. and Devin Haney clashed at Marvel Stadium in Melbourne, Australia to determine the 1st undisputed lightweight champion of the four-belt era. The fight did not proceed without controversy, as Kambosos was unable to make weight on his first attempt. He initially weighed in at 135.36 lbs, 0.36 lbs over the 135 lb limit for the lightweight division. On his second attempt an hour later, within the two-hour limit, Kambosos weighed in at 134.49 lbs. The fight then proceeded as planned and Kambosos was defeated by Haney after a unanimous decision, with two judges scoring the fight 116–112 and one judge scoring it 118–110, all in favor of Haney. The deal for the fight included an automatic rematch clause which Kambosos intends on exercising. A potential rematch would occur in late 2022 in Australia.

Kambosos vs Haney II 

George Kambosos and Devin Haney met in their rematch at Rod Laver Arena in Melbourne, Australia on October 16, 2022. Kambosos lost the fight via unanimous decision with the scores of 118–110 (twice) and 119–109, in favor of Haney.

Professional boxing record

See also
List of world lightweight boxing champions

References

External links

George Kambosos Jr - Profile, News Archive & Current Rankings at Box.Live

|-

|-

|-

|-

|-

|-

1993 births
Living people
Australian male boxers
Australian people of Greek descent
Boxers from Sydney
World lightweight boxing champions
World Boxing Association champions
International Boxing Federation champions
World Boxing Organization champions
The Ring (magazine) champions